The following is a list of Permanent Representatives of Russia to international organisations.

United Nations
The Permanent Representatives of the Russian Federation to the United Nations in the New York City, United States and representatives of the Russian Federation in the Security Council of the United Nations 
 Yuli Vorontsov (until 23 July 1994, № 1536)
 Sergey Lavrov (7 July 1994, № 1475 - 12 July 2004, № 871)
 Andrey Denisov (12 July 2004, № 873 - 8 April 2006, № 334)
 Vitaly Churkin (8 April 2006, № 336 - 20 February 2017)
 Pyotr Ilichov (Acting) (20 February 2017 - 27 July 2017)
 Vasily Nebenzya (from 27 July 2017, № 340)

UN office in Geneva
Russia's Permanent Representative to the UN Office and other International Organizations in Geneva, Switzerland 
  (until 19 October 1993, № 1663)
  (11 October 1993, № 1664 - 11 December 1996, № 1664)
  (11 December 1996, № 1665 - 3 September 1997, № 977)
 Vasily Sidorov (18 December 1997, № 1344 - 31 July 2001, № 941)
 Leonid Skotnikov (31 July 2001, № 942 - 26 December 2005, № 1528)
  (26 December 2005, № 1529 - 5 December 2011, № 1583)
  (5 December 2011, № 1585 - 31 January 2018, № 34)
  (from 31 January 2018, № 35)

UNESCO 
The Permanent Representatives of the Russian Federation to the United Nations Educational, Scientific and Cultural Organization (UNESCO) - Russia's Permanent Representative to UNESCO in Paris, France 
 Vladimir Lomeiko (until 22 September 1993, № 1402)
  (22 September 1993, № 1403 - 24 January 1998, № 67)
  (24 January 1998, № 68 - 4 June 2002, № 549)
  (4 June 2002, № 551 - 28 January 2009, № 93)
 Eleonora Mitrofanova (28 January 2009, № 94 - 19 September 2016, № 478)
  (19 September 2016, № 479 - 12 January 2023, № 7)
 Rinat Alyautdinov (from 12 January 2023, № 8)

UN International Organisations in Vienna 
The Permanent Representatives of the Russian Federation to international organizations in Vienna, Austria 
  (until 10 February 1992, № 130)
  (10 February 1992, № 132 – 24 March 1995, № 315)
  (24 March 1995, № 316 – 18 March 1999, № 359)
  (18 March 1999, № 360 – 7 April 2001, № 409)
  (7 April 2001, № 410 – 9 January 2007, № 13)
  (9 January 2007, № 14 – 26 July 2011, № 989)
 Vladimir Voronkov (26 July 2011, № 990 – 7 August 2017, № 368)
 Mikhail Ulyanov (from 23 January 2018, № 19)

UN Office in Nairobi 
The Permanent Representatives of the Russian Federation to international organizations in Nairobi, Kenya (representatives are concurrently appointed ambassador to Kenya) 
  (until 1 September 1992, № 1040)
  (1 September 1992, № 1041 - 21 July 1998, № 858)
  (21 July 1998, № 859 - 5 December 2000, № 1969)
  (5 December 2000, № 1970 - 27 July 2005, № 882)
  (27 July 2005, № 883 - 23 December 2010, № 1585)
  (23 December 2010, № 1586 - 4 May 2018, № 191)
  (from 4 May 2018, № 192)

United Nations Economic and Social Commission for Asia and the Pacific
Russia's Permanent Representative to the United Nations Economic and Social Commission for Asia and the Pacific (ESCAP) in Bangkok, Thailand (representatives are concurrently appointed ambassador to Thailand) 
  (until 6 September 1997, № 999)
  (6 September 1997, № 1000 - 29 January 2001, № 84)
  (29 January 2001, № 85 - 9 November 2004, № 1420)
  (9 November 2004, № 1421 - 3 February 2010, № 134)
  (3 February 2010, № 135 - 25 August 2014, № 579)
  (25 August 2014, № 580 - 2 November 2018, № 628)
  (from 2 November 2018, № 629)

The European Communities
Permanent Representative of the Russian Federation to the European Union in Brussels, Belgium 
 Ivan Silayev (18 December 1991, № 303 - 7 February 1994, № 249)
 Vasily Likhachev (5 May 1998, № 490 - 11 March 2003, № 317)
 Mikhail Fradkov (14 May 2003, № 526 - 5 March 2004, № 299)
  (15 July 2005, № 802 — 26 September 2022, № 665)
 Kirill Logvinov  (acting, from 26 September 2022)

Organization for Security and Co-operation in Europe 
Russia's Permanent Representative to the Organization for Security and Co-operation in Europe (OSCE) in Vienna, Austria 
 Yuri Ushakov (13 May 1996, № 705 - 6 January 1998, № 8)
  (6 January 1998, № 9 - 4 June 2001, № 642)
  (4 June 2001, № 643 - 9 April 2004, № 516)
  (9 April 2004, № 518 - 26 March 2008, № 412)
 Anvar Azimov (31 July 2008, № 1156 - 7 June 2011, № 709)
 Andrey Kelin (7 June 2011, № 710 - 5 August 2015, № 406)
  (from 5 August 2015, № 407)

Commonwealth of Independent States 
The Permanent Representatives of the Russian Federation to the statutory and other bodies of the Commonwealth of Independent States in Minsk, Belarus 
 Vyacheslav Vorobyev (11 December 1996, № 1662 - 22 July 2003, № 822)
  (28 July 2003, № 845 — 14 July 2009, № 802)
 Sergey Kopeiko (14 July 2009, № 803 -?)
  (28 December 2009, № 1508 — 3 February 2014, № 51)
  (3 February 2014, № 52 — 17 August 2018, № 486)
  (from 17 August 2018, № 487)

Council of Europe 
The Permanent Representatives of the Russian Federation to the Council of Europe in Strasbourg, France 
  (16 December 1996, № 1697 - died 21 May 1998)
  (13 October 1998, № 1221 - 31 May 2001, № 622)
  (31 May 2001, № 623 - 3 January 2007, № 1)
  (3 January 2007, № 2 — 1 October 2015, № 497)
  (1 October 2015, № 498 — 22 November 2022, № 843)

NATO 
The Permanent Representatives of the Russian Federation to the North Atlantic Treaty Organization (NATO) in Brussels, Belgium (representatives were concurrently appointed ambassador to Belgium between 1990 and 2003) 
 Nikolay Afanasevsky (24 July 1990, № 365 — 3 October 1994, № 1959)
 Vitaly Churkin (3 October 1994, № 1960 — 25 February 1998, № 198)
 Sergey Kislyak (25 February 1998, № 199 - 11 March 2003, № 321)
  (16 May 2003, № 530 - 9 January 2008, № 7)
 Dmitry Rogozin (9 January 2008, № 8 - 23 December 2011, № 1680)
 Alexander Grushko (since 23 October 2012, № 1435 — 22 January 2018, № 17)

Representative of the Russian Federation to the High Command Allied Powers in Europe 
  (1995-1997)

Senior military representative of the Russian Federation to NATO 
 Viktor Zavarzin (1997-2002)
 Valentin Kuznetsov (2002-2008)
 Alexey Maslov (2008-2011)
 Aleksandr Burov (Acting) (2011-2013) 
  (2013-2014)
 Aleksandr Burov (Acting) (from 2014)

Organisation for the Prohibition of Chemical Weapons
Russia's Permanent Representative to the Organisation for the Prohibition of Chemical Weapons in The Hague, Netherlands (representatives are concurrently appointed ambassador to the Netherlands) 
  (17 April 1998, № 408 - 20 August 2003, № 975)
 Kirill Gevorgian (20 August 2003, № 976 - 5 November 2009, № 1238)
  (5 November 2009, № 1239 — 15 September 2015, № 462)
  (from 15 September 2015, № 463)

Conference on Disarmament
The Permanent Representatives of the Russian Federation to the Conference on Disarmament in Geneva, the Swiss Confederation 
(representatives have been concurrently appointed as Permanent Representatives of the Russian Federation to the United Nations Office and other international organizations in Geneva since 1998)
  (1993 - 3 February 1998, № 133)
 Vasily Sidorov (17 April 1998, № 407 - 31 July 2001, № 941)
 Leonid Skotnikov (31 July 2001, № 942 - 26 December 2005, № 1528)
  (26 December 2005, № 1529 - 5 December 2011, № 1583)
  (5 December 2011, № 1585 - 31 January 2018, № 34)
  (from 31 January 2018, № 35)

Eurasian Economic Community 
Permanent Representative of the Russian Federation to the Eurasian Economic Community 
  (17 July 2002, № 747 — 1 February 2012, № 137)

Food and Agriculture Organization and the World Food Program 
Permanent Representative of the Russian Federation to the Food and Agriculture Organization of the United Nations (FAO) and World Food Program (WFP) (representatives were concurrently appointed ambassador to Italy between 2006 and 2012) 
  (2 September 2006, № 961 — 14 December 2012, № 1663)
  (7 April 2014, № 215 — 6 October 2017)
  (from 24 April 2018, № 173)

Organisation of Islamic Cooperation 
Permanent Representative of the Russian Federation to the Organisation of Islamic Cooperation (formerly the Organisation of Islamic Conference) in Jeddah, Kingdom of Saudi Arabia (representatives were concurrently appointed ambassador to Saudi Arabia between September 2011 and December 2018) 
 Kamil Iskhakov (14 July 2008, № 1089 — 6 September 2011, № 1165)
  (6 September 2011, № 1166 — 20 February 2017, № 75)
  (20 February 2017, № 77 — 20 December 2018, № 738)
 Ramazan Abdulatipov (from 20 December 2018, № 739)

Collective Security Treaty Organization
Plenipotentiaries of the Russian Federation to the Collective Security Treaty Organization 
  (22 February 2004, № 257 - 3 April 2006, № 317)
  (3 April 2006, № 317 - 23 August 2010, № 1050)
 Igor Lyakin-Frolov (23 August 2010, № 1050 — 11 July 2013, № 623)
  (21 October 2013, № 791 — 13 June 2018, № 301)

Permanent Plenipotentiaries of the Russian Federation to the Collective Security Treaty Organization 
  (21 February 2019, № 73 — 21 September 2021, № 537)
  (from 21 September 2021, № 538)

Arab League 
Plenipotentiary of the Russian Federation to the League of Arab States in Cairo, Egypt (representatives concurrently appointed as Ambassador to Egypt) 
 Mikhail Bogdanov (18 October 2005, № 1216 - 12 June 2011, № 789)
 Sergei Kirpichenko (7 September 2011, № 1171 - 2 September 2019)
 Georgy Borisenko (27 April 2020, № 291)

African Union 
Plenipotentiary of the Russian Federation to the African Union in Addis Ababa, Ethiopia (representatives concurrently appointed as Ambassador to Ethiopia) 
  (9 November 2006, № 1256 - 29 October 2010, № 1304)
  (29 October 2010, № 1305 — 23 June 2014, № 455)
  (23 June 2014, № 456 — 27 March 2019, № 133)
  (from 27 March 2019, № 134)

Organization of American States 
Permanent observers of the Russian Federation to the Organization of American States in Washington, D.C., U.S. (observers have been concurrently appointed Ambassador to the United States between 1992 and 1994, and since 1998)
 Vladimir Lukin (7 May 1992, Presidential order № 218-p - 8 February 1994, № 255)
  (7 December 1994, № 2165 - 31 August 1997)
 Yuri Ushakov (16 December 1998, № 1591 - 31 May 2008, № 866)
 Sergey Kislyak (26 July 2008, № 1122 — 21 August 2017, № 394)
 Anatoly Antonov (from 21 August 2017, № 395)

Latin American Integration Association
Observers of the Russian Federation to the Committee of representatives of Latin American Integration Association (observers are concurrently appointed Ambassador to Uruguay) 
  (1 October 1993, № 1520 - 13 April 1999 № 473)
  (9 August 1999, № 1023 - 31 July 2000, № 1404)
  (31 July 2000, № 1405 - 26 September 2005, № 1127)
  (26 September 2005, № 1128 — 5 November 2013, № 824)
  (15 January 2014, № 22 — 10 January 2018, № 10)
  (10 January 2018, № 11 — 5 October 2020, № 598)
  (from 5 October 2020, № 599)

Association of Southeast Asian Nations 
Permanent Representatives of the Russian Federation to the Association of Southeast Asian Nations (ASEAN) in Jakarta, Indonesia (representatives were concurrently appointed Ambassador to Indonesia between 2009 and 2017)
  (20 January 2009, № 71 — 11 October 2012, № 1398)
  (25 October 2012, № 1438 — 7 August 2017, № 354)
  (from 7 August 2017, № 355)

World Tourism Organization
Permanent Representatives of the Russian Federation to the World Tourism Organization in Madrid, Spain (representatives are concurrently appointed Ambassador to Spain)
  (3 February 2014, № 53 — 18 November 2022, № 835)

World Trade Organization
Permanent Representatives of the Russian Federation to the World Trade Organization (WTO) in Geneva, Switzerland
  (17 February 2014, № 83 — 5 December 2019, № 580)
 Dmitry Lyakishev (from 5 December 2019, № 581)

International Seabed Authority
Permanent Representatives of the Russian Federation to the International Seabed Authority in Kingston, Jamaica (representatives are concurrently appointed Ambassador to Jamaica)
  (14 March 2016, № 121 - 24 May 2021, № 307)
  (from 24 May 2021, № 314)

Notes 

Foreign relations of Russia
Politics of Russia
Lists of ambassadors of Russia